WXMW (89.3 FM) is a radio station  broadcasting a Christian radio format. Licensed to Sycamore, Ohio, United States, the station serves the areas of Upper Sandusky, Ohio and Bucyrus, Ohio.  The station is currently owned by Kayser Broadcast Ministries.

WXMW airs a variety of Christian talk and teaching programs including; Revive our Hearts with Nancy Leigh DeMoss, Insight for Living with Chuck Swindoll, and In the Market with Janet Parshall.  WXMW also airs a variety of Christian music.

References

External links
WXMW's official website

Moody Radio affiliate stations
XMW